Henry Alfred Byroade, (July 24, 1913 – December 31, 1993) was an American career diplomat. Over the course of his career, he served as the U.S. ambassador to Egypt (1955–1956), South Africa (1956–1959), Afghanistan (1959–1962), Burma (1963–1968), Philippines (1969–1973), and Pakistan (1973–1977).

Byroade graduated from West Point military academy in 1937 and began a career as an Army officer. His first post in army was on the Hawaiian Islands as a member of the Corps of Engineers from 1937 to 1939. The Corps sent him back in 1939 to engineering college. He got his master's degree in civil engineering from Cornell University in 1940, and was stationed at Langley Field, Virginia, helping to form the first aviation engineer regiment. In 1946, at the age of 32, he was promoted to the rank of brigadier general. In 1949 he was seconded to the U.S. Department of State, where he headed the Office of German Affairs. In 1952, he resigned from the Army and was appointed Assistant Secretary of State for Middle East, South Asia, and Africa—a post he held until 1955.

In 1954, he attracted criticism from both Israel and the Arab world for the US administration's policy declaration in which he told the Israelis, "You should drop the attitude of a conqueror and the conviction that force is the only policy that your neighbors will understand" and told the Arabs, "You should accept this state of Israel as an accomplished fact". That same year, he referred to Israel's Zionist ideology and its free admission of Jews through the Law of Return as "a legitimate matter of concern both to the Arabs and to the Western countries".

Byroade had been Ambassador to Egypt for more than a year when it was announced that he was being transferred. He was considered a friend of Arab causes but unable, during his Egyptian assignment, to prevent an arms deal between Czechoslovakia and Egypt, or to dissuade the Egyptian government of Gamal Abdel Nasser from expanding its campaigns against the West. Criticism of his effectiveness in Cairo in the Eisenhower Administration led to his reassignment to South Africa. Emanuel Neumann, chairman of the executive of the Zionist Organization of America urged that he be removed from Cairo, claiming he had been an apologist for the Egyptian government.

He retired from the Foreign Service in 1977, and died in Bethesda, Maryland on December 31, 1993, at the age of 80.

References

External links
 https://web.archive.org/web/20080314214120/http://www.state.gov/r/pa/ho/po/com/10404.htm
Obituary
Papers of Henry A. Byroade, Dwight D. Eisenhower Presidential Library and Museum 
Oral History Interview with Henry Byroade from the Truman Library
The State Department's Campaign Against the Jewish State Idea in 1954

1913 births
1993 deaths
Ambassadors of the United States to Afghanistan
Ambassadors of the United States to Egypt
Ambassadors of the United States to Myanmar
Ambassadors of the United States to Pakistan
Ambassadors of the United States to South Africa
Ambassadors of the United States to the Philippines
Cornell University College of Engineering alumni
United States Army generals
United States Military Academy alumni
United States Foreign Service personnel
20th-century American diplomats